Drifters is a 2003 Chinese film directed by Wang Xiaoshuai. The film is a production of Hong Kong's Purple Light Films and People Workshop with international distribution through the Taipei-based company Arc Light Films. Drifters premiered in the 2003 Cannes Film Festival as part of the Un Certain Regard competition.

Drifters follows a young slacker, Hong Yunsheng, who has become something of a local celebrity in part due to his failures as a stowaway. Recently returned to his home in Fujian after several years abroad in the U.S. as an illegal immigrant, Hong attempts to reconnect with an illegitimate son.

Cast 
Duan Yihong as Hong Yunsheng, the titular drifter in the film. Hong spent several years in the United States as an undocumented immigrant before being deported back to his home in Fujian. He spends his days loafing around his home town.
Shu Yan as Wu Ruifang, a member of a travelling Shanghai Opera troupe. Hong's love interest.
Zhao Yiwei
Tang Yang
Jin Peizhu

Plot 
Hong Yunsheng is a jobless wanderer in Fujian. Attempting to find a better life in the United States, he enters the country as an undocumented worker. While there, however, his American dream quickly falls apart when he and his boss's daughter have a child. He is then told not to visit his son and is made to sign a contract saying he will not try to see him. He violates this agreement by continuing to visit his son. Enraged, Hong's boss informs the INS and has him deported back to Fujian.

Back home, Hong again takes up his old habits, wandering around the town, unemployed and listless. At the same time, he attempts to find romance with a traveling opera performer, Wu Ruifang. Eventually he hears that the child he fathered in the United States is coming to Fujian. Desiring to see the child he has never known, Hong and his boss argue until eventually Hong takes desperate measures and kidnaps the boy.

Reception 
Unlike Wang's previous film, Beijing Bicycle, Drifters received mixed reviews from western critics. Derek Elley of Variety claimed that the film's "potentially involving story is too often chopped off at the knees," and also found the movie's cast to be limited by inexperience. Other critics were even harsher, finding that the film used over-direction to hide a simple and "syrupy" melodrama. Still others, however, were more positive. Bérénice Reynaud of Senses of Cinema found the film to be superior to the "superficial" Beijing Bicycle, and put Drifters in the growing category of "mature, disturbing, thought-provoking masterpieces inspired by globalisation."

Release 
Like many of Wang's films, Drifters was screened in the Un Certain Regard competition of the 2003 Cannes Film Festival on May 20. In addition to this, the film was screened at ten major film festivals around the world. These included:

2003 Toronto International Film Festival (Contemporary World Film), September 5, 2003
2003 Vancouver International Film Festival (official selection), October 2003
2003 Hawaii International Film Festival (official selection), November 2, 2003
2003 Nantes Three Continents Festival (official selection), November 25, 2003
2003 AFI Film Festival (official selection), November 2003
2003 Thessaloniki International Film Festival (Official Programme), November 2003
2004 Rotterdam International Film Festival (official selection), January 24, 2004
2004 Seattle International Film Festival (official selection), May 31, 2004
2004 Karlovy Vary Film Festival (official selection), July 7, 2004
2004 Calgary International Film Festival (official selection), October 2, 2004

Home media
Drifters was released on Region 1 DVD on September 15, 2005 by Film Movement. The DVD was in the original Mandarin with English subtitles. Special features included biographies of the cast and crew, and a short film, Robot Boy by Ted Passon. The disc's aspect ratio was  1.78:1 in letterbox format.

References

External links 
 
 
 

2003 films
Hong Kong drama films
2000s Mandarin-language films
2003 drama films
Films set in Fujian
Films directed by Wang Xiaoshuai
Chinese drama films